Farnborough Town Hall is a municipal building in Alexandra Road, Farnborough, Hampshire, England. The town hall, which was the headquarters of Farnborough Urban District Council, is a Grade II listed building.

History
Following significant population growth associated with the rebuilding of the North Camp in 1890, the area became an urban district in 1896. In this context, the new council decided to procure a dedicated town hall; the site they selected was open land to the west of Alexandra Road.

The new building was designed by George Sherrin in the neoclassical style, built in red brick with Bath stone dressings and was completed in 1897. The design involved a symmetrical main frontage with five bays facing onto Alexandra Road; the central section of three bays, which slightly projected forward, featured an arched doorway in the centre bay and arched windows in the other bays flanked by full-height Ionic order pilasters. There were groups of narrow casement windows on the first floor and a segmental pediment containing a carving above. It had a steep hip roof with a clock turret and weather vane at the apex. On 14 April 1920 a reception was held in the town hall for 283 returning service personnel who enjoyed a dinner and received a certificate of appreciation for their service in the First World War.

Following the demolition of the concert hall at the Royal Aircraft Establishment, the Farnborough Symphony Orchestra, which had been founded by the scientist, Ben Lockspeiser in 1922, started using the town hall as its main venue in the 1930s. The Farnborough Amateur Operatic Society also used the town hall to perform Gilbert and Sullivan operettas in the inter-war era. During the Second World War the town hall was requisitioned for use as a civil defence centre.

The building continued to serve as the headquarters of Farnborough Urban District Council for much of the 20th century and remained the local seat of government of the enlarged Rushmoor Council, which was formed in 1974, until it moved to the new civic offices, erected just under a mile to the north of the town hall in the early 1980s. Shortly before the council left the building, the Queen Alexandra's Royal Army Nursing Corps was awarded the Freedom of the Borough of Rushmoor and exercised their right to march past the town hall on 29 May 1981. The town hall was subsequently converted for commercial use and was renamed "Fernberga House".

Notes

References

Government buildings completed in 1897
City and town halls in Hampshire
Farnborough, Hampshire
Grade II listed buildings in Hampshire